Andy Tyson (October 15, 1968 – April 10, 2015) was an American businessman, writer, and mountaineer who died in April 2015 in a small plane crash, at the age of 46. At the time of his death he was a co-owner of the company Creative Energies. He died with several others in a plane crash at Diamond D ranch in the U.S. State of Idaho. The plane was a Cessna T210M and it crashed in Custer County, Idaho. In the crash investigation it was noted that wind currents in Mountain areas can push small planes around. A candlelight vigil to mourn the lost gathered 600 people in the locality.Teton Valley mourns 4 men killed in crash crash
 
Tyson achieved the first known ascent of the mountain Gamlang Razi on 7 September 2013 with Eric Daft, Mark Fisher, Chris Nance, Molly Loomis Tyson, and Pyae Phyo Aung (Myanmar) The group measured the peak to be 5,870 meters (19,259 ft), which would make it higher than Hkakabo Razi, believed at that time to be the highest peak in Myanmar and Southeast Asia. Andy Tyson also achieved the first ascent of Genyen Massif. He also taught climbers in Mynanmar and Nepal. Also known as Mount Gamlang, it was last surveyed by the British Empire in 1925.

From 1993 to 2003 Andy Tyson was an instructor at the US NOLS. Andy was one of the authors of the books Climbing Self Rescue and Glacier Mountaineering. In 2001 he co-founded Creative Energies, a company that focused on renewable energy. He also worked as a Mountain guide and survived the 2014 Mount Everest avalanche. Andy also did a talk for Tedx and after his death a memorial fund with his name was started.

Personal life 

Tyson was born October 15, 1968 in Pennsylvania and was married to Molly Loomis Tyson. He graduated from Mercersburg Academy and also studied at Wittenberg University.

See also
List of Mount Everest guides

References

1968 births
2015 deaths